Emily A. Kane is an American politician who served as a member of the New Mexico House of Representatives representing District 15 from January 15, 2013 through January 2015.

Early life 
Kane was born on May 14, 1956 in Eugene, Oregon. She attended the Emergency Medical Services Academy at the University of New Mexico.

Career
With District 15 incumbent Democratic Representative Bill O'Neill running for New Mexico Senate, Kane ran in the three-way June 5, 2012 Democratic Primary, winning with 962 votes (44.5%) and won the November 6, 2012 General election with 6,850 votes (51.2%) against Republican nominee Christopher Saucedo.

Kane sought a second term but was defeated for re-election by attorney Sarah Maestas Barnes, who won with 7,358 votes (53.2%) to 6,467 (46.8%) for Kane. The New Mexico Supreme Court later ruled that city Albuquerque city government employees, including police and fire, would be barred from holding public office concurrently.

References

External links
 Official page at the New Mexico Legislature
 Campaign site
 
 Emily A. Kane at Ballotpedia
 Emily A. Kane at the National Institute on Money in State Politics

1956 births
Living people
American firefighters
Democratic Party members of the New Mexico House of Representatives
Politicians from Albuquerque, New Mexico
Politicians from Eugene, Oregon
Women state legislators in New Mexico
21st-century American women